The 1977–78 NCAA Division I men's basketball season began in November 1977, progressed through the regular season and conference tournaments, and concluded with the 1978 NCAA Men's Division I Basketball Tournament Championship Game on March 27, 1978, at The Checkerdome in St. Louis, Missouri. The Kentucky Wildcats won their fifth NCAA national championship with a 94–88 victory over the Duke Blue Devils.

Season headlines 

 In the Pacific 8 Conference, UCLA won its 12th of what would ultimately be 13 consecutive conference titles.

Season outlook

Pre-season polls 

The top 20 from the AP Poll during the pre-season.

Conference membership changes

Regular season

Conference winners and tournaments 

The Southwestern Athletic Conference — with members Alcorn State, Grambling State, Jackson State, Mississippi Valley State, Prairie View A&M, Southern, and Texas Southern — became a Division I conference this season.

From 1975 to 1982, the Eastern College Athletic Conference (ECAC), a loosely organized sports federation of Northeastern colleges and universities, organized Division I ECAC regional tournaments for those of its members that were independents in basketball. Each 1978 tournament winner received an automatic bid to the 1978 NCAA Men's Division I Basketball Tournament in the same way that the tournament champions of conventional athletic conferences did.

Informal championships

Statistical leaders

Post-season tournaments

NCAA tournament

Final Four 

 Third Place – Arkansas 71, Notre Dame 69

National Invitation tournament

Semifinals & finals 

 Third Place – Rutgers 85, Georgetown 72

Awards

Consensus All-American teams

Major player of the year awards 

 Wooden Award: Phil Ford, North Carolina
 Naismith Award: Butch Lee, Marquette
 Helms Player of the Year: Jack Givens, Kentucky
 Associated Press Player of the Year: Butch Lee, Marquette
 UPI Player of the Year: Butch Lee, Marquette
 NABC Player of the Year: Phil Ford, North Carolina
 Oscar Robertson Trophy (USBWA): Phil Ford, North Carolina
 Adolph Rupp Trophy: Butch Lee, Marquette
 Sporting News Player of the Year: Phil Ford, North Carolina

Major coach of the year awards 

 Associated Press Coach of the Year: Eddie Sutton, Arkansas
 Henry Iba Award (USBWA): Ray Meyer, DePaul
 NABC Coach of the Year: Bill Foster, Duke & Abe Lemons, Texas
 UPI Coach of the Year: Eddie Sutton, Arkansas
 Sporting News Coach of the Year: Bill Foster, Duke

Other major awards 

 Frances Pomeroy Naismith Award (Best player under 6'0): Mike Scheib, Susquehanna
 Robert V. Geasey Trophy (Top player in Philadelphia Big 5): Michael Brooks, La Salle
 NIT/Haggerty Award (Top player in New York City metro area): George Johnson, St. John's

Coaching changes 

A number of teams changed coaches during the season and after it ended.

References